The House of Racoviță (anglicized Racovitza) was a family of Moldavian and Wallachian boyars which gave the Danubian Principalities several hospodars, becoming influential within the Ottoman Empire and the Phanariote kinship network.

History 
Their ancestors became boyars under Alexandru Lăpușneanu (r. 1552–61; 1564–68). A member of the family was mentioned in a chrysobull dated 7 October 1487. The name is Slavic (Rakovica, meaning "crab"). The family was partially Hellenized. One of its branches remained present inside Romania. By the 17th century, the family was one of the leading families in the region. It later managed to penetrate into the Phanariote nucleus in Constantinople, which facilitated and increased their chances to occupy the thrones in their native country, and later to successfully maintain their positions. It remained influential in the Kingdom of Romania.

Notable members 
 Constantin Racoviță (1699–1764), Prince of Moldavia and Wallachia
 Emil Racoviță (1868–1947), Romanian biologist, zoologist, and explorer
 Ioan Mihail Racoviță (1889–1954), Romanian general in World War II
 Mihai Racoviță (c. 1660–1744), Prince of Moldavia and Wallachia
 Nicolae Gr. Racoviță (1835–1894), Romanian politician
 Ștefan Racoviță (1713–1782), Prince of Wallachia

References

Sources

 
Romanian people of Greek descent
Phanariotes
Romanian boyar families
Romanian-language surnames
Moldavian nobility
People from the Ottoman Empire of Romanian descent